Oleksiy Pavlovych Torokhtiy (born May 22, 1986 in Zuhres) is a Ukrainian weightlifter, an Olympic Gold Medalist in weightlifting (London 2012) until disqualified for a doping offence, winner of World and European Championships. Participant of two Olympic Games (2008, 2012). Oleksiy was also a Member of European Weightlifting Federation Executive Committee, Deputy Chairman of Ukrainian National Olympic Commіttee Athletes Commission and the Vice-President of the Weightlifting Federation of Ukraine (2016-2020).

Currently, Oleksiy actively holds master classes and seminars on weightlifting all over the world. Oleksiy is the founder of international sportswear and accessories brand "Warm Body Cold Mind". Oleksiy is an author and creator of a series of training programs and nutrition sets called TORWOD.

Oleksiy is one of the biggest social media influencers in weightlifting, with more than half a million subscribers. He is famous for his free training videos on his YouTube channel. In 2019, he was awarded with YouTube Silver Play Button for more than 100,000 subscribers.

Biography 
Torokhtiy was born on May 22, 1986 in Zugres, Donetsk region, Ukraine.

In 2003 he graduated from Kharkiv Regional Higher School of Physical Culture with a degree in Physical Education.

In 2010 he graduated from Kharkiv Aviation Institute with a major in "Control system for flying machines and complexes" and was certified as an engineer.

In 2013, he launched his YouTube channel and became popular for his free training videos. Later he made video collaborations for his channel with world famous athletes including Oleksandr Usyk, Noah Ohlsen, Ruslan Nurudinov, Rebeka Koha, Zhan Belenyuk, Levan Saginashvili, Aleksandar Rakic, Dmyto Chumak, Oleksiy Novikov, Yaroslav Amosov.

In 2014 he received a second degree in Zaporizhzhya National University, specializing in physical education and sports / weightlifting coach.

In 2016, he founded the international brand of sportswear and accessories "Warm Body Cold Mind" (WBCM). It became famous for its slogan on t-shirts. "The (WBCM) shirt made its debut in (famous American baseball player Bryce Harper) his first media address in Florida, and was casually noted by the Washington Post, ESPN, Yahoo! Sports and more, who failed to grasp what it means". Now his brand is selling online all over the world and also available on Amazon. Since 2019 “Warm Body Cold Mind” collaborated with world-famous weightlifters as Rebeka Koha, Mohamed Ehab and Ruslan Nurudinov.

In 2020, Oleksiy released his eBook titled “The Snatch MasterClass: Olympic Weightlifting Course for Athletes & Coaches“. That same year, he entered the National University of Ukraine on Physical Education and Sport to obtain a Ph.D. in Sports Science. He is currently writing his Ph.D. thesis titled “The Development of Remote Training Programs.” Oleksiy based his second eBook, “The Olympic Clean MasterClass“ on his Ph.D. research.

Personal life 
Oleksiy Torokhtiy is married to Daria who works as a guitar teacher. Oleksiy and Daria have a son Myron (2015).

Sports career 
Oleksiy started weightlifting in 2000. In 2005 he joined the Ukrainian national Olympic weightlifting team.

In 2006, at the European Junior Championships, he became a bronze medalist in the snatch and clean & jerk.

In 2007 he became the winner of the World Weightlifting Cup in Apia.

In 2008, he became a participant of the XXIX Olympic Games in Beijing, where he became one of the 10 strongest athletes in the category of up to 105 kg. Due to a lack of financial support, he had to retire from competitive Olympic Weightlifting right after the Olympic Games 2008 in Beijing. 5 months after his retirement, he got a sponsor, that allowed him to continue with his professional career.

In 2009 he became he won the gold in clean & jerk and became a silver medalist in European Championships in Bucharest (405 kg).

In 2010, he received the silver in clean & jerk and became the bronze medalist of the European Weightlifting Championships in Minsk.

In 2011 in Paris, Oleksiy Torokhtiy became the bronze medalist of the World Championship.

On August 6, 2012 in London Oleksiy became the Olympic Gold Medalist in weightlifting in the category 105 kg.

On 22 December 2018, it was announced that as a consequence of the International Olympic Committee’s re-analysis program in connection with the 2012 London Olympic Games Oleksiy had tested positive for performance-enhancing drugs. and in December 2019 it was confirmed that he had been disqualified.

Major results

Books 
 The Snatch MasterClass: Olympic Weightlifting Course for Athletes & Coaches (2020).
 The Olympic Clean MasterClass (2021).

References

External links
Facebook 
Instagram
Youtube

 "Oleksiy Torokhtiy". London 2012.

1986 births
People from Zuhres
World Weightlifting Championships medalists
Living people
Ukrainian male weightlifters
Olympic weightlifters of Ukraine
Weightlifters at the 2008 Summer Olympics
Weightlifters at the 2012 Summer Olympics
Competitors stripped of Summer Olympics medals
Doping cases in weightlifting
Ukrainian sportspeople in doping cases
European Weightlifting Championships medalists
Sportspeople from Donetsk Oblast